The Cadenazzo–Luino railway is a railway line that joins Switzerland and Italy.

History 
The line was opened on 4 December 1882 by the Gotthardbahn. On 1 May 1909 it became part of the Swiss Federal Railways. It was electrified on 11 June 1960.

Service 
The railway is served by the S30, operated by TiLo.

References

External links 

 Detaillierte Streckenbeschreibung

International railway lines
Railway lines in Lombardy
Railway lines in Switzerland
Railway lines opened in 1882